Araminta Estelle "Minta" Durfee (October 1, 1889 – September 9, 1975) was an American silent film actress from Los Angeles, California, possibly best known for her role in Mickey (1918).

Biography
She met Roscoe Arbuckle when he was attempting to get started in theater, and the two married in August 1908. Durfee entered show business in local companies as a chorus girl at the age of 17. She was the first leading lady of Charlie Chaplin.

Durfee and Arbuckle separated in 1921, just prior to a scandal involving the death of starlet Virginia Rappe. There were three trials and finally Arbuckle was acquitted, but his career was destroyed and he received few job offers. Durfee and Arbuckle divorced in 1925. Durfee in her later years said Arbuckle was "the most generous human being I've ever met", and "if I had to do it all over again, I'd still marry the same man." Durfee was an avid defender of her close friend Mabel Normand throughout Normand's many public scandals.

A regular performer on television, Durfee appeared on such shows as Noah's Ark (1956). She had minor roles in motion pictures including How Green Was My Valley (1941), Naughty Marietta (1935), Rose-Marie (1936), It's A Mad, Mad, Mad, Mad World (1963), The Unsinkable Molly Brown (1964), and Savage Intruder (1970).

In later life, Durfee gave lectures on silent film and held retrospectives on her and her husband's pictures. She was surprised and excited by the renewed interest in silent film.

Durfee died in Woodland Hills, California, at the Motion Picture Country Home in 1975. She suffered from a heart ailment.

Filmography

His Sister's Kids (1913, Short) (uncredited)
Fatty's Day Off (1913, Short)
A Quiet Little Wedding (1913, Short) as Fatty's fiancée
Fatty at San Diego (1913, Short) as Girl at the carnival
Wine (1913, Short) as Diner's sweetheart
Fatty Joins the Force (1913, Short) (uncredited)
Fatty's Flirtation (1913, Short) as Minta
Ambrose's First Falsehood (1914, Short) (uncredited)
A Misplaced Foot (1914, Short)
The Under-Sheriff (1914, Short) as The Sheriff's Wife
A Flirt's Mistake (1914, Short) (uncredited)
Rebecca's Wedding Day (1914, Short) as Wedding guest (uncredited)
Making a Living (1914, Short) as Girl (uncredited)
Tango Tangles (1914, Short) as Guest
Cruel, Cruel Love (1914, Short) as The Lady
The Star Boarder (1914, Short) as Landlady
Twenty Minutes of Love (1914, Short) as Edgar's girl
Where Hazel Met the Villain (1914, Short)
Caught in a Cabaret (1914, Short) as Cabaret patron / Girl in park (uncredited)
A Suspended Ordeal (1914, Short)
The Water Dog (1914, Short) as Nursemaid
The Alarm (1914, Short)
The Knockout (1914, Short) as Pug's sweetheart (uncredited)
Fatty and the Heiress (1914, Short)
Fatty's Finish (1914, Short)
The Sky Pirate (1914, Short)
Those Happy Days (1914, Short)
Fatty's Gift (1914, Short) as Fatty's Wife
The Masquerader (1914, Short) as leading lady
His New Profession (1914, Short)
The Rounders (1914, Short) as Fatty's wife
Lover's Luck (1914, Short) as The Girl
Fatty's Debut (1914, Short)
Fatty Again (1914, Short) as Proprietor's daughter
Lovers' Post Office (1914, Short) as Fatty's sweetheart
An Incompetent Hero (1914, Short) as Neighbor's maid
Tillie's Punctured Romance (1914) as Maid (uncredited)
Fatty's Wine Party (1914, Short) as in a minor role (uncredited)
Leading Lizzie Astray (1914, Short) as Lizzie, the farm boy's fiancée
Fatty's Magic Pants (1914, Short) as Fatty's sweetheart
Fatty and Minnie He-Haw (1914, Short) as Minta
Dirty Work in a Laundry (1915, Short) (uncredited)
A Bird's a Bird (1915, Short) (uncredited)
Fatty and Mabel at the San Diego Exposition (1915, Short) as Jealous husband's wife (uncredited)
Mabel, Fatty and the Law (1915, Short) as Flirty wife
Fatty's Reckless Fling (1915, Short) as Neighbor's wife
Fatty's Faithful Fido (1915, Short) (uncredited)
Fatty's Chance Acquaintance (1915, Short) as Pickpocket's girlfriend
That Little Band of Gold (1915, short)
Fatty's Faithful Fido (1915, Short) as Fatty's sweetheart
When Love Took Wings (1915, Short)
Court House Crooks (1915, Short) as Judge's wife
Dirty Work in a Laundry (1915)
Fickle Fatty's Fall (1915, Short) as Fatty's wife
Fatty and the Broadway Stars (1915, Short) as Sam Bernard's leading lady
Fatty and Mabel at the San Diego Exposition (1915, Short) (uncredited)
Bright Lights (1916, Short) in a minor role (uncredited)
His Wife's Mistakes (1916, Short)
The Other Man (1916, Short)
The Cabaret (1918)
Mickey (1918) as Elsie Drake
Skinner's Dress Suit (1926) as Party guest (uncredited)
Naughty Marietta (1935) in minor role (uncredited)
The Man with Nine Lives (1940) (uncredited)
Glamour for Sale (1940) as Matron (uncredited)
Rollin' Home to Texas (1940) (uncredited)
The Devil and Miss Jones (1941) as Customer (uncredited)
How Green Was My Valley (1941) in a minor role (uncredited)
The Miracle Kid (1941) as Pheney
The Man Who Returned to Life (1942) as Mrs. Tuller (uncredited)
Blondie for Victory (1942) as Housewife (uncredited)
The Chance of a Lifetime (1943) (uncredited)
Eve Knew Her Apples (1945) as Landlady (uncredited)
The Son of Rusty (1947) as Townswoman (uncredited)
My Dog Rusty (1948) as Mrs. Laura Foley (uncredited)
How to Be Very, Very Popular (1955) as Older woman (uncredited)
Artists and Models (1955) as Dancer (uncredited)
Around the World in 80 Days (1956) as an extra (uncredited)
Hollywood or Bust (1956) as Miss Pettywood (uncredited)
The Buster Keaton Story (1957) as Boarder (uncredited)
An Affair to Remember (1957) as Ship passenger (uncredited)
Will Success Spoil Rock Hunter? (1957) as Scrubwoman (uncredited)
The Big Fisherman (1959) in a minor role (uncredited)
Beloved Infidel (1959) (uncredited)
My Six Loves (1963) as Woman at auction (uncredited)
It's a Mad, Mad, Mad, Mad World (1963) as Woman in crowd (uncredited)
The Unsinkable Molly Brown (1964) as Denver party guest (uncredited)
Caprice (1967) as Agent (uncredited)
Savage Intruder (1970) as Guest
Willard (1971) (uncredited)
What's the Matter with Helen? (1971) as Old lady (uncredited)
The Steagle (1971) as Old lady (uncredited)
Portnoy's Complaint (1972) as Elevator lady

References

External links

1889 births
1975 deaths
American film actresses
American silent film actresses
Actresses from Los Angeles
20th-century American actresses